The 2015 Australian Manufacturers' Championship was an Australian motor racing series for modified production touring cars. It comprised three CAMS sanctioned national championship titles:
 The Australian Manufacturers' Championship for automobile manufacturers
 The Australian Production Car Championship for drivers
 The Australian Endurance Championship for drivers

Australian Manufacturers Championship Pty Ltd was appointed by CAMS as the Category Manager for the championship.

The Australian Manufacturers' Championship was awarded to BMW Australia Pty Ltd, the  Australian Production Car Championship was won by Grant Sherrin driving a BMW 135i and the Australian Endurance Championship was also won by Grant Sherrin.

Class structure
Cars were classified into the following six classes:
 Class A : Extreme Performance
 Class B : High Performance
 Class C : Performance
 Class D : Production
 Class E : Compact
 Class I : Invitational

Calendar
The championship was contested over five rounds.

The results for each round of the Championship were determined by the number of points scored by each driver at that round.

Points system
In rounds with one scheduled race, points were awarded on a 120–90–72–60–54–48–42–36–30–24–18–12–6 basis for the first thirteen places in each class with 3 points for other finishers.

In rounds with two scheduled races, points were awarded on a 60–45–36–30–27–24–21–18–15–12–9–6–3 basis for the first thirteen places in each class in each race with 2 points for other finishers.

Each manufacturer was able to score points towards the Australian Manufacturers' Championship title from the two highest placed automobiles of its make, in any class, excluding Class I. The title was awarded to the manufacturer scoring the highest total number of class points over all rounds of the championship.

Points towards the Australian Production Car Championship outright title were awarded to drivers based on outright finishing positions attained in each race. In addition two points were awarded to the driver setting the fastest qualifying lap in each class at each round.

Points towards the Australian Production Car Championship class titles were awarded to drivers based on class finishing positions attained in each race. In addition two points were awarded to the driver setting the fastest qualifying lap in each class at each round.

Points towards the Australian Endurance Championship outright title were awarded to drivers based on outright finishing positions attained in Rounds 1, 2 and 5. In addition two points were awarded to the driver setting the fastest qualifying lap in each class at each of these rounds.

Points towards the Australian Endurance Championship class titles were awarded to drivers based on class finishing positions attained in Rounds 1, 2 and 5. In addition two points were awarded to the driver setting the fastest qualifying lap in each class at each of these rounds.

Results

Australian Manufacturers' Championship
The Australian Manufacturers' Championship was awarded to BMW Australia Pty Ltd.

Australian Production Car Championship

Australian Endurance Championship
The Australian Endurance Championship was contested at Rounds 1, 2 & 5.

Teams Trophy
The Teams Trophy was awarded to the driver pairing that scored the highest total number of class points over all rounds. It was won by Grant Sherrin and Iain Sherrin.

References

Australian Manufacturers' Championship
Australian Production Car Championship
Australian Endurance Championship
Manufacturers' Championship